The 1980 United States presidential election in Massachusetts took place on November 4, 1980, as part of the 1980 United States presidential election, which was held throughout all 50 states and D.C. Voters chose 14 representatives, or electors to the Electoral College, who voted for president and vice president. By an exceptionally narrow margin, Massachusetts was carried by the Republican nominee, former Governor Ronald Reagan of California, over incumbent Democratic President Jimmy Carter of Georgia. Also contesting the state was independent candidate Congressman John B. Anderson of Illinois, who won an unexpectedly solid 15%, mostly from disaffected Democratic voters.

On election day, Reagan won a plurality of 41.90% of the vote in the state to Carter's 41.75%, with Anderson in third at 15.15%, giving Reagan a razor-thin margin of 0.1517%. This constitutes the fifteenth-smallest percentage margin in any statewide presidential election since the Civil War, and the smallest since Kennedy won Hawaii by 115 votes in that state's inaugural presidential election two decades previously. The only smaller percentage margins since have been Florida (537 votes or 0.009%) and New Mexico (361 votes or 0.061%) in the controversial 2000 election, and Missouri in 2008, which John McCain won by 3,903 votes or 0.1343%.

With President Carter a greatly weakened incumbent by 1980, Reagan won a comfortable election victory nationwide. Massachusetts had been a Democratic-leaning state since 1928, and a Democratic stronghold since 1960. In 1972, Massachusetts was the only state in the nation to vote for Democrat George McGovern over Republican Richard Nixon in his 49-state landslide. However, in 1980 the Democratic Party in Massachusetts was divided and weakened after Carter had been unsuccessfully challenged by Massachusetts Senator Ted Kennedy (brother of the late President John F. Kennedy) in a bitter primary race which left many liberal voters in the state estranged from the incumbent, thus allowing Reagan to become the first Republican to win Massachusetts’ electoral votes since the landslide re-election of Dwight Eisenhower in 1956.

Another major contributing factor to Reagan's win in Massachusetts was the strong third party candidacy of John Anderson, a liberal Republican Congressman who ran in 1980 as an independent after failing to win the Republican Party's own presidential nomination. Anderson proved very popular with liberal and moderate voters in New England who normally leaned Democratic but were dissatisfied with the policies of the Carter Administration and viewed Reagan as too far to the right. In 1976, Carter had won Massachusetts with 56% of the vote, however, in 1980 he bled a substantial amount of this support to Anderson, allowing Reagan to eke out a narrow win with only 41.90% of the vote. Nevertheless, Reagan became the first Republican ever to win the White House without carrying Dukes County, which cast only its third-ever Democratic vote in 1980, after 1964 and 1976. With 15.15% of the vote, Massachusetts would prove to be John B. Anderson's strongest state in the nation, and more than double the 6.61% total he received nationwide.  

While Reagan nationally won a convincing victory in the electoral college, Massachusetts would be his narrowest win, with the state being about ten percent more Democratic than the national average. As of 2020, this election marks only the third and last time (after 1852 and 1972) that Massachusetts has not voted for the same candidate as neighboring Rhode Island. It is also the last time that the towns of Belmont, Heath, Hull, Lexington, Lincoln, Swampscott, Truro, Warwick, and Wellfleet have voted Republican.

Primaries

Results

Results by county

Results by municipality

See also
 Presidency of Ronald Reagan
 United States presidential elections in Massachusetts

References

Massachusetts
1980
1980 Massachusetts elections